Oberg is a surname. Notable people with the surname include:

Berthold von Oberg (died 1494), Roman Catholic prelate and Auxiliary Bishop of Mainz
Carl Oberg (1897–1965), high ranking member of the SS in Nazi Germany
Dawn Oberg (born c.1965), American singer-songwriter and pianist
Evan Oberg (both 1988), Canadian professional ice hockey player
James Oberg (born 1944),  American space journalist and historian
Lyle Oberg (born 1960), Canadian politician in Alberta
Kalervo Oberg (1901–1973), Canadian anthropologist
Matt Oberg (born 1976), American actor
Margo Oberg (born 1953), American surfing champion
Metta von Oberg (1737–1794), German baroness 
Ralph Oberg (1899–1961), American art director
Scott Oberg (born 1990), American professional baseball player

Places
Oberg, Germany, a village in Ilsede, Lower Saxony

See also
Öberg, a Swedish surname
Eilhart von Oberge (fl. late 12th century), German poet